Del mio meglio n. 2 is a compilation album by Italian singer Mina, released in 1973.

The album is a collection of songs previously published in other albums, except for "Uomo", "Eccomi" and "La mente torna", released only on 45rpm records.

Track listing

Side A

Side B

Credits
Mina – vocals
Natale Massara – arranger/conductor in "Ballata d'autunno (Balada de otoño)" and "Uomo"
Gianni Ferrio – arranger/conductor in "Parole parole" and "Someday (You Want Me to Want You)"
Pino Presti – arranger/conductor in "Fate piano", "Grande grande grande", "Vorrei averti nonostante tutto" and "Fiume azzurro"
Dario Baldan Bembo – arranger/conductor in "Eccomi"
Gian Piero Reverberi – arranger/conductor in "Amor mio" and "La mente torna"
Nuccio Rinaldis – sound engineer

Mina (Italian singer) compilation albums
1973 compilation albums
Italian-language compilation albums
Albums conducted by Pino Presti
Albums arranged by Pino Presti